Pablo Sierra may refer to:

Pablo Sierra (footballer) (born 1978), Spanish footballer
Pablo Sierra (runner) (born 1969), Spanish long-distance runner